James Edward Stockwell (December 14, 1876 – July 23, 1948) was a Republican who served in the California State Assembly between 1929 and 1933, serving in Assembly Districts 73rd and 66th. He was born on December 14, 1876, and at the age of 22 served in the United States Army during the Spanish–American War. He died on July 23, 1948, in Orange County, California.

References

External links

American military personnel of the Spanish–American War
20th-century American politicians
Republican Party members of the California State Assembly
1876 births
1948 deaths